The women's 1500 metres race of the 2013–14 ISU Speed Skating World Cup 5, arranged in Eisstadion Inzell, in Inzell, Germany, was held on 7 March 2014.

Ireen Wüst of the Netherlands won the race, while Lotte van Beek, also of the Netherlands, came second, and Brittany Bowe of the United States came third. Diane Valkenburg of the Netherlands won the Division B race.

Results
The race took place on Friday, 7 March, with Division B scheduled in the morning session, at 12:52, and Division A scheduled in the afternoon session, at 17:06.

Division A

Division B

References

Women 1500
5